Robert Michael Bailor (born July 10, 1951) is a former Major League Baseball player best known for being the first player selected by the Toronto Blue Jays in the 1976 Major League Baseball expansion draft.

Early years
Bailor was born in Connellsville, Pennsylvania, the fifth of Robert and Agnes Bailor's six children. His family name was Bialkowski when they first arrived in the United States from Poland. Robert was an engineer for the Chesapeake & Ohio Railroad, hauling coal, iron ore and limestone, and Agnes was a stay-at-home mom.

In August 1963, Connellsville won the Pennsylvania state Little League title. Bailor attended Geibel Catholic High School but did not play high school ball, as neither Geibel nor Connellsville High School had a baseball team. Bailor did, however, play basketball in high school, and set the team record for most points in a game.

Bailor played baseball with the Connellsville American Legion team. Among his teammates were future Seattle Mariners pitcher Bob Galasso and first baseman Jim Braxton, who went on to have an eight-year career in the National Football League with the Buffalo Bills. It was through the American Legion that Bailor caught the eye of Baltimore Orioles scout Jocko Collins.

Baltimore Orioles
He was immediately a utility player, playing the outfield, second base, third base, shortstop and even pitching for one game in his first professional season with the Bluefield Orioles. In  with the Aberdeen Pheasants, Bailor led the Class A Northern League with a .340 batting average. In , he led the Class A California League with 63 stolen bases. Eventually, he began playing more and more shortstop by the time he debuted with the Baltimore Orioles in September .

He started both games of a September 28 doubleheader with the New York Yankees, one at short and the other at second, and collected his first major league hit off Larry Gura in the second game. In total, Bailor batted .288 with twelve home runs and 201 runs batted in over seven seasons in the Orioles' farm system. He was three-for-thirteen with no home runs or RBIs at the major league level.

Toronto Blue Jays
After the Seattle Mariners selected Ruppert Jones from the Kansas City Royals with the first overall pick in the expansion draft, the Toronto Blue Jays made Bailor the second overall pick. Despite the fact that he did not have an everyday position, Bailor appeared in 122 games, and logged 523 plate appearances his rookie season in Toronto. He led the team in hits, (154) stolen bases (15), runs scored (62), and his .310 batting average set an expansion team record. He had ten assists from the outfield in just 537 innings, and was named to the Topps Rookie All-Star team at shortstop despite the fact that he only appeared in 53 games at short. On April 20, the New York Yankees' Sparky Lyle struck Bailor out for the first time in his major league career. Bailor had batted a record 51 times before striking out for the first time.

In 1978, he drove in a career high 52 runs while striking out only 21 times in 621 at-bats. He was named the Blue Jays Player of the Year for the first two years of the franchise's existence.

Bailor's production declined in 1979, as he batted only .229 with 1 home run and 38 RBI in 130 games, however, his fifteen assists from right field tied Dwight Evans for the most in the American League. In , Bailor lost his job in right field to Lloyd Moseby, and was used as a fourth outfielder. He also appeared in three games as a relief pitcher, allowing two earned runs in 2.1 innings pitched. On December 12, the Blue Jays traded Bailor to the New York Mets for pitcher Roy Lee Jackson.

New York Mets
Bailor spent a month on the disabled list with a rib cage injury, and was used sparingly his first season in New York, appearing in 51 games and logging just 81 at-bats. He went into Spring training  competing for either of the two middle infield positions, and began the season competing with Wally Backman and Tom Veryzer for playing time at second base. With both Bailor and Backman batting over .300 at the end of May, Bailor began seeing more playing time at short and third base. He ended the season with 404 plate appearances, his most since 1979. He also stole a career-high 20 bases, and led the National League with an 87% stolen base percentage.

He began the  season as the Mets' starting shortstop. For the season, he appeared in 118 games, his highest total since 1979. On December 8, Bailor and pitcher Carlos Diaz were shipped to the Dodgers for Sid Fernandez and Ross Jones.

Los Angeles Dodgers
Bailor's first season in Los Angeles started late and ended early due to injuries. He dislocated his left shoulder during Spring training, causing him to miss the first month of the  season. He then tore the cartilage in his right knee during batting practice on August 12 requiring arthroscopic surgery that pretty much ended his season. He ended the season hitting .275 with 0 HR and 8 RBI in just 65 games. In 1985, Bailor hit .246 with 0 HR and 7 RBI in 74 games with Los Angeles, helping the team reach the post-season. In the 1985 NLCS against the St. Louis Cardinals, Bailor got into two games, going hitless in one at-bat, as the Dodgers lost to the Cardinals. On April 2, 1986, the Dodgers released Bailor.

Career stats

Bailor's .310 batting average with the expansion Toronto Blue Jays broke Rusty Staub's record set in 1969 with the Montreal Expos (.302). The two were teammates on the New York Mets from 1981 to 1983. Bailor wore number 4 with the Mets, Staub's number during his first tenure with the club (1972–1975). Though he proved to be one of the great utility players of his era, Bailor never liked the term. "It sounds like a guy who changes light bulbs."

Management
Shortly after his release from the Dodgers, Bailor was offered a player-coach position with Toronto's triple A affiliate, the Syracuse Chiefs. He turned the position down in order to spend time with his newborn child, Robert Michael, Jr. A year later, he accepted a position with the organization managing the Florida State League's Dunedin Blue Jays. From  until , Bailor served as a coach with the Toronto Blue Jays.

References

External links
, or The Baseball Page, or Retrosheet, or SABR Biography Project, or Pura Pelota (Venezuelan Winter League)

1951 births
Living people
Aberdeen Pheasants players
American expatriate baseball players in Canada
Asheville Orioles players
Baltimore Orioles players
Baseball players from Pennsylvania
Bluefield Orioles players
California University of Pennsylvania alumni
California Vulcans baseball players
Lodi Orions players
Los Angeles Dodgers players
Major League Baseball center fielders
Major League Baseball coaches
Major League Baseball second basemen
Major League Baseball shortstops
Major League Baseball third basemen
Navegantes del Magallanes players
American expatriate baseball players in Venezuela
New York Mets players
People from Connellsville, Pennsylvania
Rochester Red Wings players
Syracuse Chiefs managers
Toronto Blue Jays players